Keokuk High School is a rural public four-year high school located in Keokuk, Iowa. The school, a part of the Keokuk Community School District, draws students from the southernmost part of Lee County, Iowa. For athletics, Keokuk High School is classified as 3A, the second largest class in Iowa.  They are a member of the Southeast Conference.

Athletics 
The Chiefs compete in the Southeast Conference in several sports:

 Cross Country (boys & girls)
 Football (boys)
 Swimming (boys & girls)
 Volleyball (girls)
 Basketball (boys & girls)
 Bowling (boys & girls)
 Wrestling (boys)
 Golf (boys & girls)
 Soccer (boys & girls)
 Track (boys & girls)
 Tennis (boys & girls)
 Baseball (boys)
 Softball (girls)

State Championships
 Girls' Bowling - 2-time Class 1A State Champions (2009, 2012)
 Football - 2007 Class 3A State Champions
 Boys' Golf - 2-time State Champions (1966, 1996)
 Boys' Tennis - 1993 Class 1A State Champions
 Girls' Cross Country - 1986 Class 3A State Champions
 Boys' Cross Country - 1928 State Champions

See also
List of high schools in Iowa

References

External links 
 
 

Educational institutions in the United States with year of establishment missing
Buildings and structures in Keokuk, Iowa
Public high schools in Iowa
Schools in Lee County, Iowa